Saeed Kamali Dehghan ( born 1 May 1985 in Karaj, Iran) is an Iranian-British journalist who writes for The Guardian. He was named as the 2010 Journalist of the Year in Britain at the Foreign Press Association. He currently writes for The Guardian as a staff journalist from its London offices and has worked as an Iran correspondent for The Guardian from Tehran in the past, especially in summer 2009. He is a co-producer of the HBO's documentary For Neda and was a recipient of the 70th annual Peabody Award for his HBO film.

Biography

Kamali Dehghan was born on 1 May 1985 in Karaj, a city near Tehran, the capital of Iran. He graduated in 2011 from the City University Department of Journalism, with a Master of Arts (MA) in International Journalism, after receiving a scholarship from Open Society Institute. His BA was in Rolling Stock Engineering from Iran University of Science and Technology.

He has written in Persian, English and French for a number of different newspapers around the world, including Le Monde, Shargh and Etemaad. He covered Tehran unrest after the Iranian presidential election, 2009, for the foreign media including CNN, CBC, France 24, Channel 4 and  The Guardian.

Awards
Saeed Kamali Dehghan is named as the 2010 Journalist of the Year at the Foreign Press Association. He also received the FPA award for the Best Documentary of the Year for making For Neda.
He is also a recipient of the 70th annual Peabody Award for his film For Neda. He received a Peabody Award in a ceremony hosted by Larry King at the Waldorf-Asotria in New York on 23 May 2011.

Book
Saeed Kamali Dehghan's first book, Twelve Plus One, was published in Iran in January 2017 by Ofoq publications. It is a collection of his interviews with 12 writers and one film-maker, including Mario Vargas Llosa, Paul Auster, EL Doctorow and David Lynch. He has conducted several other original interviews with internationally known writers including John Barth, E. L. Doctorow, Eric-Emmanuel Schmitt, Amélie Nothomb, Andreï Makine, Isabel Allende, Tzvetan Todorov, T.C. Boyle, Alain de Botton and Noam Chomsky.

Film
Saeed Kamali Dehghan is a co-producer of the HBO's documentary For Neda. On March 3, 2020 he said he regrets making that documentary because "I was naive to believe the Western narrative about her death. I was sent to Iran as a journalist to naively humanize their narrative but I didn’t know what their narrative was. When they got my footage from me, from then on I was nobody and I was deeply upset about the film, even though I didn’t show it at the time."

References

External links
Saeed Kamali Dehghan official website 
Column archive in The Guardian

1985 births
People from Karaj
Living people
Iranian journalists
Iranian emigrants to the United Kingdom
The Guardian journalists
Iranian LGBT writers
Gay writers
21st-century Iranian people